Rock Sound International Airport  is an airport in the South Eleuthera district of The Bahamas. Its name comes from the former district of Rock Sound.

Airlines and destinations

Historically, Rock Sound was served by Pan Am beginning the mid-1960s with Boeing 707 and Boeing 727 jetliner service to Miami and New York JFK Airport via an intermediate stop in Nassau.  The airport is one of the very few in The Bahamas to have received such mainline jet service.  In addition, during the late 1970s, Air Florida served the airport with Boeing 737 jetliners with nonstop flights to Miami. Lauda Air Italy also flew weekly charters to Milan for a brief period in 2001.

References

Airports in the Bahamas
Eleuthera